Bantia is a genus of mantises in the family Thespidae.

Species
Bantia chopardi Giglio-Tos, 1915
Bantia fusca Chopard, 1911
Bantia marmorata Saussure & Zehntner, 1894
Bantia metzi Beier, 1935
Bantia michaelisi Beier, 1935
Bantia nana Toledo Piza, 1969
Bantia pygmaea Saussure, 1872
Bantia simoni Chopard, 1916
Bantia werneri Chopard, 1913
Bantia yotocoensis Salazar, 2004

See also
 List of mantis genera and species

References

 
Thespidae
Mantodea genera
Taxa named by Carl Stål